This page is a list of preserved narrow-gauge steam and other locomotives built by the Hunslet Engine Company of Leeds in England.

Many of them can be seen working at heritage railways in the UK.

Steam locomotives

Diesel locomotives

Electric locomotives

References

External links
 quarryhunslet
 heritagerailways

Lists of locomotives and rolling stock preserved on heritage railways in England
Hunslet locomotives
Hunslet narrow gauge locomotives
United Kingdom narrow gauge rolling stock
Narrow gauge locomotives